Yu Jinhe (1887 – after 1945) was a politician of the Republic of China. He was born in Shaoxing, Zhejiang. He graduated from the Imperial Japanese Army Academy. He was the 2nd collaborationist mayor of Beijing. He served on the North China Political Council from February-November 1943. After the downfall of Wang Jingwei's government in August 1945, Yu was arrested and later died in prison at an unknown date.

Alma mater

Imperial Japanese Army Academy

References

Bibliography
 
 王娟「自由学園北京生活学校の設立について」 『鶴山論叢』第10号、2010年3月31日  Kobe University
 
 
 

1887 births
20th-century deaths
Republic of China politicians from Zhejiang
Chinese collaborators with Imperial Japan
Imperial Japanese Army Academy alumni
Mayors of Beijing
Chinese people who died in prison custody
Politicians from Shaoxing
Prisoners who died in Chinese detention